Sergey Kot (born 7 January 1960) is a Uzbekistani athlete. He competed in the men's shot put at the 1996 Summer Olympics.

References

1960 births
Living people
Athletes (track and field) at the 1996 Summer Olympics
Soviet male shot putters
Uzbekistani male shot putters
Olympic athletes of Uzbekistan
Place of birth missing (living people)
Athletes (track and field) at the 1994 Asian Games
Athletes (track and field) at the 1998 Asian Games
Asian Games competitors for Uzbekistan